Leveroni is a surname. Notable people with the surname include:

 Frank J. Leveroni (1879–1948), Italian-American jurist
 Rosa Leveroni (1910–1985), Catalan poet and narrator

Italian-language surnames